is a district located in Hiyama Subprefecture, Hokkaido, Japan.

As of 2004, the district has an estimated population of 15,173 and a density of 14.14 persons per km2. The total area is 1,072.86 km2.

Towns and villages
Imakane

Districts in Hokkaido